The 2008 Yamaguchi gubernatorial election was held on 3 August 2008 to elect the next governor of , a prefecture of Japan in the Chūgoku region of the main island of Honshu.

Candidates 
Sekinari Nii, elected in 1996, 2000 and 2004, endorsed by LDP, New Komeito and prefectural assembly lawmakers from DPJ.
Toshiki Fukue, former chairman of prefectoral Labour federation, backed by the JCP.

Results

References 

2008 elections in Japan
Yamaguchi gubernational elections